The men's 1000 metres competition in short track speed skating at the 2022 Winter Olympics was held on 5 February (heats) and 7 February (finals), at the Capital Indoor Stadium in Beijing. Ren Ziwei of China won the event, achieving his first individual Olympic gold medal. His teammate, Li Wenlong took the silver – his first Olympic medal, and Shaoang Liu of Hungary won the bronze.

The 2018 champion, Samuel Girard, retired from competitions. The 2018 silver medalist, John-Henry Krueger, qualified for the Olympics but was representing Hungary rather than the United States, which he represented in 2018. The bronze medalist, Seo Yi-ra, was not competing. Shaolin Sándor Liu was the 2021 World Short Track Speed Skating champion at the 1000 m  distance. Shaoang Liu and Pietro Sighel were the silver and bronze medalists, respectively. Many top athletes did not participate in the championship, however. Pascal Dion was leading the 2021–22 ISU Short Track Speed Skating World Cup at the 1000 m distance with four races completed before the Olympics, followed by Hwang Dae-heon, the world record holder, and Itzhak de Laat.

Qualification

Countries were assigned quotas based on their performance during the 2021–22 ISU Short Track Speed Skating World Cup, with the top 32 athletes (maximum of three per country qualifying quotas. If a NOC declined a quota spot, it was distributed to the next available athlete, only if the maximum quota of 56 athletes per gender was not surpassed.

Records
Prior to this competition, the existing world and Olympic records were as follows.

The following records were set during the competition.

Results

Heats

Quarterfinals

Semifinals

Finals

Final B

Final A

Concerns and controversies
Two Korean competitors were penalized during the semifinals and Shaolin Sándor Liu of Hungary at the conclusion of the A final. Two skaters from China advanced to the A final as a result of the penalties during the semifinals.

Both the Korean team and Hungarian teams filed a protest against the penalty and yellow card decisions and the ISU (International Skating Union) posted a statement regarding these protests. Based on the ISU General Regulations, Rule 123, paragraphs 4 and 5, the Referee confirmed that the protests are being rejected. More specifically,

 A protest from the Korean team inquiring for the reasons for the penalty during the 1000 m semi-final of HWANG Daeheon. As announced on the video screen in the arena, the Skater got a penalty for an “illegal late pass causing contact”.   
 A protest from the Hungarian team against the yellow card for LIU Shaolin Sandor in the 1000 m Final A. As announced on the video screen in the arena, the Skater received a yellow card for two penalties in the same race. The first penalty: “in the straight lane change from inside to out causing contact” and the second penalty was for an “arm block at the finish”.

The Korean Sport & Olympic Committee did not accept this statement however and later filed an official appeal with the Court of Arbitration for Sport over the disqualification of two of the South Korean athletes from the event's semifinals.

References

Men's short track speed skating at the 2022 Winter Olympics